USCGC Northland (WMEC-904) is a United States Coast Guard medium endurance cutter. Her keel was laid down in 1981 and she was launched in 1982 by the Tacoma Boatbuilding Company of Tacoma, Washington. She was commissioned on December 17, 1984.

History
The USCGC Northland is the second cutter to carry that name and the fourth of the thirteen Famous Class cutters currently serving in the WMEC- 270' fleet. Northland is home ported in Portsmouth, Virginia.

Northland has many missions including Search and rescue, Law Enforcement and Interdiction, Homeland Security, and Defense Operations. Northland's crew is composed of officers and enlisted personnel with a large variety of different Coast Guard rates. Northland's primary area of operation includes but is not limited to the Atlantic Ocean, the Caribbean Sea, and the Gulf of Mexico.

Images

External links

Northland home page

Ships of the United States Coast Guard
Famous-class cutters
1982 ships
Ships built by Tacoma Boatbuilding Company